Fiorentino Palmiotto (9 April 1929 – 1 August 2021) was an Italian chess player and International Arbiter (1991).

Biography
From the 1950s to the 1970s, Palmiotto was one of Italy's leading chess players. In 1958, he was awarded National Master title. In 1964, Palmiotto won 16th Italian Correspondence Chess Championship. Also he was silver (1962) and four time bronze (1961, 1967, 1971, 1972) medalist in Italian Correspondence Chess Championships. In 1965, Fiorentino Palmiotto won Italian Chess Blitz Championship. He won Italian chess tournaments in San Benedetto del Tronto (1965) and Rovigo (1976). In 1972, Palmiotto with Bologna Chess Club team won Italian Team Chess Championship. He three times in row won Italian Senior Chess Championship in 1993, 1994 and 1995.

Palmiotto played for Italy in the Chess Olympiads:
 In 1958, at fourth board in the 13th Chess Olympiad in Munich (+2, =4, -6),
 In 1960, at third board in the 14th Chess Olympiad in Leipzig (+6, =6, -4).

Palmiotto served as an advisor to the Italian Chess Federation.

References

External links

Fiorentino Palmiotto chess games at 365chess.com

1929 births
2021 deaths
Sportspeople from Ravenna
Italian chess players
Chess Olympiad competitors
20th-century chess players
Chess arbiters